Reşo Zîlan (1947) is a contemporary Swedish writer, translator and linguist of Kurdish origin. He was born in Doğubayazıt, Turkey and emigrated to Sweden in 1973. He is currently the president of the Language and Literature Department of the Kurdish Institute of Paris.

Books
Translation of Arhuaco Sierra Nevada, by Bengt Arne Runnerström,Kurdiska kulturförl., 54 pp., Stockholm, 1985.   
Şev baş Alfons Åberg, Translation of a work by Gunilla Bergström, Kurdiska kulturförl., 24 pp., Stockholm, 1985.  
Bavo, were derve, Translation of a work by Inger and Lasse Sandberg, Kurdiska kulturförl., 32 pp., Stockholm,  1986.  
Emîl, mîha nîvçe, Translation of a work by Petra Szabo, Kurdiska kulturförl., 28 pp., Stockholm, 1986.  
Kundirê helez, Translation of a work by Lennart Hellsing, Kurdiska kulturförl., 27 pp., Stockholm, 1986.  
Kela jînê, Translation of a work by Veronica Leo, Kurdiska kulturförl., 32 pp., Stockholm, 1986.  
Sûmiya Zîrek ya hejmar 325, Translation of a work by Astrid Lindgren, Kurdiska kulturförl., 59 pp., Stockholm, 1986.  
Nebezê li Çiyayê Mazî, Translation of a work by Jens Ahlbom, Kurdiska kulturförl., 29 pp., Stockholm, 1987.  
Spî û Reş û hemûyên din, Translation of a work by Inger och Lasse Sandberg, Kurdiska kulturförl., 29 pp., Stockholm,  1987.  
Akin di hembêza welatê nû de : zarokeke penaber vedigêre, Translation of a work by Binnie Kristal-Andersson, Kurdiska kulturförl., 39 pp., Stockholm,  1989.  ; 91-86146-28-9 
Kino digot: Ka lingê min bicebirîne!, Translation of a work by  Inger and Lasse Sandberg, Kurdiska kulturförl., 32 pp., Stockholm, 1991.

Dictionaries
Svensk-kurdiskt lexikon (nordkurdiska)(Swedish-North Kurdish Dictionary), Statens institut för läromedel (SIL), 311 pp., Stockholm, 1989.   
Svensk-sydkurdiskt lexikon (Swedish-South Kurdish Dictionary), Statens skolverk, 309 pp., Stockholm, 1992,

See also
 Kurdish Institute of Paris
 Kurmancî Linguistic magazine.
 Kurmanji

References

External links
Reşo Zîlan, Immigrant Institute, Sweden.

Swedish people of Kurdish descent
Kurdish-language writers
1947 births
Living people
Turkish emigrants to Sweden